Kozhevniki is a rural locality (a village) in Vereshchaginsky District, Perm Krai, Russia. The population was 41 as of 2010.

Geography 
Kozhevniki is located 19 km east of Vereshchagino (the district's administrative centre) by road. Moskvyata is the nearest rural locality.

References 

Rural localities in Vereshchaginsky District